The 2014 Kyrgyzstan League is the 23rd season of Kyrgyzstan League, the Football Federation of Kyrgyz Republic's top division of association football. Alay Osh are the defending champions, having won the previous season. The season will start on 21 March 2014.

League table

Zone A

Zone B

Play off

Statistics

Top scorers
Zone A

Zone B

References

Kyrgyzstan League Second Level seasons
2
Kyrgyzstan
Kyrgyzstan